The 2021 Hastings Borough Council election took place on 6 May 2021 to elect members of Hastings Borough Council in England. This was on the same day as other local elections.

Results summary

Ward results

Ashdown

Baird

Braybrooke

Castle

Central St Leonards

Conquest

Gensing

Hollington

Maze Hill

Old Hastings

Ore

Silverhill

St Helens

Tressell

West St Leonards

Wishing Tree

References

Hastings
2021
2020s in East Sussex